Mreimin is a village in Idlib Governorate, Syria. Administratively, the village belongs to Nahiya Darkush in Jisr al-Shughur District. In the 2004 census, Mreimin had a population of 1923.

References 

Villages in Idlib Governorate